The Bird King is a 2019 fantasy novel by writer G. Willow Wilson. Set in 1491, the novel takes place in the Emirate of Granada during the territory's final days. The story concerns the flight of Fatima and Hassan, a concubine and mapmaker, respectively, from service to the Emirate's last sultan.

According to literary review aggregator Book Marks, the novel received mostly "Rave" reviews. Laura Miller, writing for Slate, praised the novel for its "[...] rare portrayal of a platonic love fiercer than any of its erotic counterparts."

References

2019 fantasy novels
American fantasy novels
Novels set in Spain
Emirate of Granada
Fiction set in 1491
Novels set in the 1490s
Grove Press books